Agent Orange is an herbicide and defoliant used by military forces.

Agent Orange may also refer to:

Music
 Agent Orange (album), an album by Sodom
 Agent Orange (band), a punk rock band from Orange County, California
 "Agent Orange", a song by Ski Patrol
 "Agent Orange", a song by Tori Amos from Boys for Pele
 "Agent Orange", a song by Depeche Mode from the single "Strangelove"
 "Agent Orange", a song by Cage Kennylz
 "Agent Orange", a song by Heaven Shall Burn from Wanderer
 "Agent Orange", a song by Limewax
 "Agent Orange", a song by Pharoahe Monch
 "Agent Orange", a song by Slapshock

Comics
 Agent Orange (Wildstorm), a character from Wildcats
 Larfleeze or Agent Orange, a DC Comics supervillain from the Green Lantern series
 Agent Orange, a minor foe of Batman's family

Other uses
 Agent Orange (film), a 2004 silent film
 Agent Orange (video game), a 1987 shoot 'em up game for the Commodore 64

See also
 List of comic book characters named Agent Orange